The Isle of View is a live acoustic album by rock band The Pretenders, released in 1995. It was recorded in May during a live, televised performance at London's Jacob Street Studios. The Duke Quartet accompanied Chrissie Hynde for much of the performance. The title is a pun (same-sounding phrase or mondegreen) on the words I Love You.

Track listing
All songs written by Chrissie Hynde, except where noted.

"Sense of Purpose" – 3:50
"Chill Factor" – 4:01
"Private Life" – 4:42
"Back on the Chain Gang" – 4:17
"Kid" – 3:56
"I Hurt You" – 4:29
"Criminal" – 4:18
"Brass in Pocket" (James Honeyman-Scott, Hynde) – 3:23
"2000 Miles" – 3:40
"Hymn to Her" (Meg Keene) – 3:52
"Lovers of Today" – 5:19
"The Phone Call" – 2:55
"I Go to Sleep" (Ray Davies) – 2:57
"Revolution" – 6:28
"The Isle of View" – 0:42

Personnel

Pretenders
Chrissie Hynde – lead vocals, rhythm guitar
Adam Seymour – lead guitar, harmonium, backing vocals
Andy Hobson – bass guitar
Martin Chambers – drums, backing vocals

Additional personnel
Damon Albarn – piano
The Duke Quartet, whose members at the time were:
John Metcalfe – viola
Louisa Fuller – violin
Richard Koster – violin
Ivan McCready – cello
Mark "Wiff" Smith – percussion

Charts

References

The Pretenders live albums
Albums produced by Stephen Street
1995 live albums
Warner Records live albums